Oxymacaria is a genus of moths in the family Geometridae described by Warren in 1894.

Species
Oxymacaria ceylonica Hampson, 1902
Oxymacaria odontias (Lower, 1893) Australia
Oxymacaria oliva (Swinhoe, 1894) northern Himalayas, Java, Borneo
Oxymacaria penumbrata (Warren) Himalayas
Oxymacaria palliata (Hampson, 1891) India
Oxymacaria temeraria (Swinhoe, 1891) India, western China, Taivan, Japan, Borneo
Oxymacaria truncaria Leech

References

Geometridae